WJYI (103.1 FM) is a college radio station broadcasting a Variety format. Licensed to Tifton, Georgia, United States, the station is owned by Abraham Baldwin Agricultural College (ABAC). It is funded, managed and operated by students with the assistance of a faculty advisor.

History
The station went on the air as WABR-FM in 1974. On June 1, 1988, the station changed its call sign to WPLH. The WABR call letters were transferred to a new Peach State Radio transmitter. The tower for the new, higher-power public radio station was intended to be built on University of Georgia property, but a surveying error placed the site on an ABAC pasture and, with FCC and FAA approval already secured, it had to be built on college property.

In 2008, WPLH began streaming the on-air broadcast over the internet.

In the FCC non-commercial stations filing window of 2021, ABAC received a construction permit for a new 265-watt station at 88.3 MHz. The WJYI call sign was assigned to the construction permit and then switched with WPLH on August 3, 2022, as WPLH's programming moved to the higher-power facility.

References

External links

JYI
Radio stations established in 1974
1974 establishments in Georgia (U.S. state)